Pitehno (also Romanized as Pītehno; also known as Pet No) is a village in Shohada Rural District, Yaneh Sar District, Behshahr County, Mazandaran Province, Iran. At the 2006 census, its population was 445, in 103 families.

References 

Populated places in Behshahr County